The Sample-McDougald House (also known as the Sample Estate or Pinehaven) is a  historic home in Pompano Beach, Florida, built in 1916. It is currently located at 450 Northeast 10th Street, but was originally built on Dixie Highway and moved to its present location by the Sample-McDougald House Preservation Society in 2001. On September 15, 2004, it was added to the U.S. National Register of Historic Places. The house is open as a house museum of pioneer South Florida lifestyle. The house grounds are Centennial Park, maintained by the city of Pompano Beach.

Building
It is a two-story wood house with an irregular floor plan. Large central hallways on each floor are the axis of the interior space.

History
The original site and building known as the Sample Estate was listed on the National Register of Historic Places in 1984. When the house was moved in 2001 it was de-listed. In 2004 it was renominated (as the "Sample-McDougald House") and added to the register in 2004.

References

External links

 
 Broward County listings at National Register of Historic Places
 Division of Historical Resources
 
 

Houses in Broward County, Florida
Houses on the National Register of Historic Places in Florida
National Register of Historic Places in Broward County, Florida
Buildings and structures in Pompano Beach, Florida
Colonial Revival architecture in Florida
Historic house museums in Florida
Museums in Pompano Beach, Florida
Parks in Broward County, Florida